Traianos Nallis was a Greek notable and politician.

Biography 
Nallis was born in 1874 in Gradešnica, then in the Ottoman Empire (now in North Macedonia). He grew up in Monastir (now Bitola), where his family had moved for security. His brother Stavros was one of the three founders of the Interior Organization of Monastir in 1904. Nallis was a notable of the Greek community and was elected in 1908 as a representative of the Greek community of the kaza of Monastir to the Ottoman Chamber of Deputies following the Young Turk Revolution. His election was a tremendous success for the local Greeks, as the election period was characterized by unprecedented violence as the Young Turks were trying to make as many Greeks as they could not to vote. Traianos Nallis was one of the three Greek deputies who were elected in the Monastir Vilayet and re-elected in the  1912 elections.

Sources 
 Θέματα Ελληνικής Ιστορίας, Η Νεοτουρκική Επανάσταση, ο τερματισμός του Μακεδονικού Αγώνα και οι πρώτες εκλογές στην Οθωμανική Αυτοκρατορία
 Γεώργιος Γκλιάτης, Η Ελλάδα 100 χρόνια πριν
 Κωσταραζινό, Ο Μακεδονικός Αγώνας (μέρος 3ο): Η ένοπλη φάση (1904-1908)
 Aykut Kansu, The Revolution of 1908 in Turkey, publications Brill, 1955, p. 228, 250
 Members of the Meclis-I Mebusan, 1912
 μηνιαία Εφημερίδα Άργους Ορεστικού: Ορεστίς, April 2012, στήλη: Πριν από 100 χρόνια, Απρίλιος 1912, p. 4

1874 births
Politicians of the Ottoman Empire
Greek politicians
People from Novaci Municipality
20th-century people from the Ottoman Empire
Year of death missing
Greek people from the Ottoman Empire